The Boston Navy Yard, originally called the Charlestown Navy Yard and later Boston Naval Shipyard, was one of the oldest shipbuilding facilities in the United States Navy. It was established in 1801 as part of the recent establishment of the new U.S. Department of the Navy in 1798. After 175 years of military service, it was decommissioned as a naval installation on 1 July 1974.

The  property is administered by the National Park Service, becoming part of Boston National Historical Park. Enough of the yard remains in operation to support the moored USS Constitution ("Old Ironsides") of 1797, built as one of the original six heavy frigates for the revived American navy, and the oldest warship still commissioned in the United States Navy and afloat in the world.   , a 1943 World War II-era Fletcher-class destroyer serving as a museum ship, is also berthed here. The museum area includes a dock which is a stop on the MBTA Boat water transport system.  Among local people in the area and the National Park Service, it is still known as the Charlestown Navy Yard.

The South Boston Naval Annex was located along the waterfront in South Boston, an annex of the Navy Yard from 1920 to 1974. Other annexes of the Navy Yard during World War II were the Chelsea Naval Annex (formerly the Green Shipyard, now the Fitzgerald Shipyard), East Boston Naval Annex, and Boston Naval Yard Fuel Depot Annex.

History
The earliest naval shipbuilding activities in Charlestown, Massachusetts across the Charles River and Boston harbor to the north from the city of Boston, began during the American Revolutionary War (1775–1783). The Charlestown Arsenal of United States Army was established in 1794. Shortly thereafter, in 1800, the land for the Charlestown Navy Yard was purchased by the United States government and the yard itself was established. The yard built the first U.S. ship of the line,  in 1814, and at least twelve small vessels for the American Civil War, but was primarily a repair and storage facility until the 1890s, when it started to build steel ships for the "New Navy". By then, it was called the Boston Navy Yard.

On 24 June 1833, the staff and dignitaries including then Vice President Martin Van Buren, Secretary of War Lewis Cass, Secretary of the Navy Levi Woodbury, and many Massachusetts officials, witnessed "one of the great events of American naval history": the early United States frigate  was inaugurating the first naval drydock in New England designed by prominent civil engineer Loammi Baldwin, Jr.

The ropewalk supplied cordage used in the Navy from the time it opened in 1837 until the Yard closed in 1975. After the Civil War (1861–1865), the Yard was downgraded to an Equipment and Recruit Facility.

In the late 1880s and 1890s, the Navy began expanding again bringing into service new modern steel-hulled steam-powered warships and that brought new life to the Yard.  In the first years of the 20th century, a second drydock was added. During World War II (1939/1941–1945), it worked to fix British Royal Navy warships and merchant transports damaged by the Nazi Germans when crossing the North Atlantic Ocean.  On 27 September 1941—Liberty Fleet Day—Boston launched two destroyers, USS Cowie and the USS Knight.  Even before the U.S. entered the Second World War after the Pearl Harbor attack on 7 December 1941, a month before in November, Boston was one of four United States naval shipyards selected to build s under the Lend-Lease military assistance program for the Royal Navy. Since the United States was at war when these ships were finally completed, some were later requisitioned and used by the United States Navy as destroyer escorts.

In the post war period, the shipyard modified World War II ships for Cold War (1945–1991) service through Fleet Rehabilitation and Modernization (FRAM). The Korean War (1950–1953), and Vietnam War (1964–1975) did not bring much work to the yard since it was so far from the fighting. The Yard closed after the Vietnam War.

It was also the location of the Marine Barracks Boston.

Dry Docks and Slipways

Ships built at Boston Navy Yard

Current use 
When ideas were floated for redevelopment of the yard, one of the people's popular idea was to have the yard turned into a construction yard for oil tankers. Ultimately, these plans fell through, and the site became part of the Boston National Historical Park. Its mission is, "to interpret the art and history of naval shipbuilding".

The Boston Navy Yard hosts many attractions, including Charlestown Naval Shipyard Park. The fully commissioned  and the museum ship  are tied up at Pier 1 and open to the public. The Navy Yard also hosts the USS Constitution Museum. Dry Dock No. 1 is still used for ship maintenance for Constitution and Cassin Young. In May 2015, Constitution entered the dry dock for three years of repairs.

The Yard is toward the north end of the Freedom Trail. The MBTA Boat stops at nearby Pier 4, providing easy visitor access to the Yard. The campus of the MGH Institute of Health Professions occupies seven buildings in the Yard, including classroom, office, and clinical space. Spaulding Rehabilitation Hospital and multiple Massachusetts General Hospital research laboratories occupy the perimeter.

Gallery

See also
 Port of Boston
 List of National Historic Landmarks in Boston
 National Register of Historic Places listings in northern Boston, Massachusetts
 List of military installations in Massachusetts

References

External links

 Charlestown Navy Yard – Boston National Historical Park
 Charlestown Online Navy Yard website

Navy Yards of the United States Navy
Historic districts in Suffolk County, Massachusetts
Navy Yard, Boston
National Historic Landmarks in Boston
Navy Yard, Boston
Manufacturing companies based in Boston
Navy Yard, Boston
Maritime museums in Massachusetts
Military and war museums in Massachusetts
Naval museums in the United States
Military facilities on the National Register of Historic Places in Massachusetts
Boston National Historical Park
1800 establishments in Massachusetts
Shipyards on the National Register of Historic Places
National Register of Historic Places in Boston
Military installations established in 1800
Military installations closed in 1974
Closed installations of the United States Navy
Shipyards building World War II warships